"Never Worn White" is a song by American singer Katy Perry. It was released by Capitol Records as a standalone single on March 5, 2020. The song was released alongside a music video, in which Perry announced her pregnancy. "Never Worn White" was later included as a bonus track on the Japanese and deluxe edition of Perry's sixth studio album, Smile.

Composition 
"Never Worn White" is a "powerhouse" piano-led ballad, with "graceful" production and a "heartfelt" chorus.

Music video 
The official music video for "Never Worn White" premiered alongside the song. It shows Perry alternately shown wearing a white dress and an elaborate dress of flowers as she sings the song. At the end of the video, Perry is shown cradling her tummy, announcing her pregnancy.

Commercial performance 
"Never Worn White" entered charts in European countries, reaching number 97 in the United Kingdom and number 39 in Hungary. On the New Zealand Hot Singles Chart, "Never Worn White" debuted at number 12. The song did not chart on the Billboard Hot 100, but landed at number 12 on the Bubbling Under Hot 100.

Credits and personnel 
Credits adapted from Tidal.

 Katy Perry – vocals, songwriting
 Johan Carlsson – production, songwriting, programming, piano
 Jacob Kasher Hindlin – songwriting
 John Ryan – songwriting
 Peter Karlsson – vocal production
 Rami – programming
 David Bukovinszky – cello
 Mattias Bylund – string arrangement, strings
 Mattias Johansson – violin
 Cory Bice – engineering
 Jeremy Lertola – engineering
 Sam Holland – engineering
 Şerban Ghenea – mixing
 Dave Kutch – master engineering
 John Hanes – mix engineering

Charts

Release history

References 

2020 singles
2020 songs
2020s ballads
Capitol Records singles
Katy Perry songs
Pop ballads
Songs written by Jacob Kasher
Songs written by Johan Carlsson (musician)
Songs written by John Ryan (musician)
Songs written by Katy Perry